Interwetten was founded in 1990. It operates in the field of online entertainment, offering its customers sports betting, live betting, a casino, a live casino, and games.

In 1997, Interwetten became the second company in the world, after Intertops, to also offer sports betting online. Therefore, the company can be seen as one of the pioneers in the branch of online entertainment. Today, the company is based in Malta.

The online entertainment platform is currently available in ten languages, and is visited by Interwetten customers in more than 200 countries around the world. The company is particularly well known in German-speaking countries and southern Europe for its sports betting offer. In 2012, Interwetten customers placed bets on more than 100,000 different sports events held in over 70 countries.

Interwetten was a founding member of the non-profit organisation European Gaming & Betting Association (EGBA). It is also a member of the European Sports Security Association (ESSA), which was established in 2005.

Licences
Interwetten Gaming Ltd. in Malta holds licences to operate sports betting, games, and a casino online.
 
On 1 June 2012, Interwetten España Plc. was officially licensed by Spanish regulatory authority DGOJ, and since then it has been online in Spain with a sports betting and casino game portfolio.

Since December 2012, Interwetten Gaming Ltd. has been authorised to offer sports betting in Schleswig-Holstein. Authorisation for casino games was granted by the Ministry of the Interior of Schleswig-Holstein in January 2013.

Interwetten Gaming Ltd expanded into Africa for the first time in March 2020 by acquiring a Nigerian betting license from the National Lottery Regulatory Commission. To strengthen their visibility and gain further traction in the market, Interwetten recently signed the Nigerian footballer Yakubu Ayegbeni as their official Nigeria ambassador.

Company history
Interwetten was founded in September 1990 in Vienna, Austria. Between 1990 and 1997, the company exclusively offered sports betting, with customers placing their bets via telephone. In 1997, Interwetten took its business online, and, in 2004, a casino area was added to the product portfolio. In June 2006, Interwetten launched a Skill Games platform.

Product portfolio

Sports betting 
Interwetten has been offering sports betting since 1990. This has been available online since 1997. Interwetten can be seen as one of the pioneers of the branch. Since the launch of the website, the company's customer base has grown significantly year by year.

Casino
Customers have been able to visit Interwetten's online casino since July 2004. The casino games, which are particularly popular among female customers, include classics such as Roulette and Blackjack. The Live Casino offer is also very popular among the casino's visitors.

Online games
The skill games platform, featuring games that test the player's skill and aptitude, was added to the company's product portfolio in 2006. Among these products are also particular games such as "Schnapsen", which is not widely available as an online game.

Mobile platform

Sports betting
In 2004, Interwetten led the way in making its betting offer available on mobile devices. The betting offer is optimized for Android mobile phones, the iPhone and iPad, and Windows Phones.
Customers have the opportunity to also place combination and system bets while on the move. Handy shortcuts make placing bets easy. The "Today" shortcut, for example, shows the user the betting programme over the next 24 hours.

Casino and Live Casino
Interwetten offers its customers access to the Online Casino in a format designed especially for tablets and smartphones. The Interwetten Live Casino, featuring Roulette, Black Jack, and Casino Hold’em, is also available for tablet users.

Sponsorship 
The company acts as a sponsor of various sports events and clubs as well as charities and social projects.

References

External links

Online gambling companies of Malta
Online poker companies
Internet properties established in 1990
Gambling companies established in 1990
1990 establishments in Malta